Commerce College may refer to:

Bangladesh
 Dhaka Commerce College, a master's level college in Mirpur, Dhaka, Bangladesh
 Chittagong Commerce College, a government college in Agrabad, Chittagong, Bangladesh
 Azam Khan Commerce College, the first Commerce college in Bangladesh

India
 Commerce College, Jaipur, a college in Rajasthan, India
 Commerce College Ground, a cricket ground in Ahmedabad, India
 Goenka College of Commerce and Business Administration, a premiere commerce college of India

Kokrajhar
 Commerce College, Kokrajhar, a college for commerce in Kokrajhar